The grain per gallon (gpg) is a unit of water hardness defined as 1 grain (64.8 milligrams) of calcium carbonate dissolved in 1 US gallon of water (3.785412 L). It translates into 1 part in about 58,000 parts of water or 17.1 parts per million (ppm). Also called Clark degree (in terms of an imperial gallon).

Usage
Calcium and magnesium ions present as sulfates, chlorides, carbonates and bicarbonates cause water to be hard. Water chemists measure water impurities in parts per million (ppm). For understandability, hardness ordinarily is expressed in grains of hardness per gallon of water (gpg). The two systems can be converted mathematically.

Measurement of water hardness

According to the Water Quality Association:

 soft: 0-3.5 grains per gallon (gpg)
 moderate: 3.5-7.0 gpg
 hard: 7.0-10.5 gpg
 very hard: over 10.5 gpg

Conversions
1 gpg = 0.017118061 kg/m3
1 gpg = 1 pound per 7000 gallons
1 gpg = 17.12 mg/L (ppm)
1 Clark degree = 0.8327 gpg
1 dGH = 1.042645169 gpg
1 mg/L (ppm) = 0.058417831 grains per US gallon

See also
Degrees of General Hardness

References
http://www.businessdictionary.com/definition/grains-per-gallon-GPG.html 
https://web.archive.org/web/20100819220926/http://agfacts.tamu.edu/D10/Comal/FCS/Water/F1/nhardwtr.htm
http://www.water-research.net/Waterlibrary/watermanual/conversion_factors.pdf

Units of measurement
Water chemistry